Roy Walter Sleap (5 September 1940 – 3 October 2005) was an English footballer who represented Great Britain at the 1960 Summer Olympics. Sleap played as an amateur for Barnet.

Early life
He attended Edmonton County School from 1952.

References

External links
 

1940 births
2005 deaths
Footballers from Greater London
English footballers
Barnet F.C. players
Enfield F.C. players
Hendon F.C. players
Footballers at the 1960 Summer Olympics
Olympic footballers of Great Britain
England amateur international footballers
People educated at Edmonton County School
Association football midfielders